, known by the pen name , was a Japanese manga artist.

In 1990, she debuted in the June issue of the monthly manga anthology Garo with Nekojiru Udon, which is now considered her definitive work.

Early life 
Hashiguchi was born on January 19, 1967, to a wealthy family in Kawaguchi, Saitama Prefecture. Her first spoken word was reportedly "idiot." Her schooling is unknown but editor Yoshiaki Yoshinaga states Hashiguchi attended a beauty school near her hometown. As a student she religiously followed new wave musicians such as EP-4 and TACO. 

At 18, she would marry alternative manga artist Hajime Yamano, assisting his work by shading in scenes. At that time, Nekojiru reportedly had no interest in becoming a mangaka herself.

Career 
While absentmindedly sketching "an odd octopus-like cat" Yamano took interest in Nekojiru's drawings, stating "it had a raw childlike appearance that wasn't filtered through adult eyes - it was cute, repulsive, and cruel-looking all at the same time." Using the sketch as a motif Yamano wrote a script and Nekojiru illustrated what would become Nekojiru Udon. She was completely self-taught, having received no formal lessons from her husband. The work was brought to Garo and was well-received by editor Maki Takaichi.

Her work would experience a surge in popularity through the subversive manga trend during the mid to late 1990's. The pop aesthetics and surreal presentation of her work began to appeal to the general public, teens in particular. The couple took any solicitations for work they could get, resulting in an incredibly arduous workload for both of them.

In April and May of 1998, Nekojiru spoke with several editors complaining about the workload and artistic limitations imposed by the new influx of work. In a call with a Hakusensha editor she reportedly stated "I'm tired of drawing manga. I want to quit and move to a developing country with my husband."

Works 
With the exception of Tsunami, all Nekojiru's work has main characters drawn as cats. Even in her manga essays, Jirujiru Travel Journal and Jirujiru Diary, she drew herself as a cat. But though the characters appear as animals, the artist chose as her setting not a forest, but rather the human world. Her manga detailing the daily life and adventures of the cats Nyāko and Nyatta are held in high esteem. The major themes of her work are a childlike zaniness, cruelty and nostalgia. And, as is shown in Dream Memo, included in the posthumously released compilation Nekojiru Udon 3, many of her bizarre works of fantasy were based on her own dream experiences. Psychedelic mushrooms and LSD also often appear in her works.

Yamano Hajime, using the pen-name Nekojiru-y, took over Nekojiru's world, and continues to produce new works. On his official site, one could read a free chapter of Nekojiru's manga. At the end of November 2020, however, it was announced the site would be closed for an extended length of time, and has remained down as of writing.

There have been two animated adaptations of Nekojiru's manga, both of them focusing on the family of Nyāko, Nyatta and their parents. The second, and more famous, at least among English speakers, is the 2001 OVA , released in English as Cat Soup.

Personality 
A reclusive and private figure, Nekojiru never released biographic essays or portraits like other manga artists. A rare picture of her was published in the June 1992 volume of Garo. According to Garo editor Maki Takaichi, she rarely left the house, disliked being at kissatens, and avoided conversations heavy with social etiquette. Her husband Hajime Yamano wrote in JiruJiru Nikki that she was an "eccentric" and "naive" person with an assertive sense of likes and dislikes when it came to other people. She habitually made her discontent known with often-repeated phrases such as "boring", "I don't care", and "we're not compatible." Editor Yoshiaki Yoshinaga who was a close friend of Nekojiru wrote that Yamano "was like a mother" to Nekojiru, supporting both her work and personal life. Mangaka Takashi Nemoto remarked, "They weren't just co-workers or partners or friends, I felt they had a deep relationship that transcended Yoko Ono and John Lennon."

On the other hand Nekojiru pursued her interests intently, showing up unannounced to Yamano's apartment prior to dating. She also took her responsibility as an artist seriously, always meeting deadlines and negotiating for lower unit prices for her work to be accessible to teens. She was briefly hospitalized for overworking prior to her suicide.

Nekojiru reportedly had a lifelong aversion to food, commenting that meat and fish "tastes like blood." Peyotl Kōbō editor Saki Tatsumi remarked that she witnessed Nekojiru spitting out a mouthful of avocado after trying it. She once told Yamano that "Tonkatsu is just a pig's carcass." Accordingly, pigs are depicted in Nekojiru's work as lowly prey animals that are cursed at and butchered for food.

List of works 
 
 
 
 
 
 
 
 

Nekojiru also worked as an illustrator and character designer on other projects.

Death
Hashiguchi died by suicide on May 10, 1998. Her suicide note reportedly included "Forget I even lived" "I don't need a grave" and "Don't talk about why I died." Yamano declined to provide details about motives but denied media allegations that it was a copycat suicide after musician hide's death. Contrary to her wishes her family buried her ashes in an anonymous grave.

Shortly before her suicide, Nyāko and Nyatta, the two main characters of Nekojiru Udon, were selected to be used by Tokyo Electric in promotional campaigns. However, the death of their creator caused that to be cancelled.

In popular culture
The Gothball episode "Japan" is an homage to Nekojiru's work. Pieces of paper (LSD) with Nekojiru cat faces are seen in the episode "Goth's Trip".

References

External links
Official site (Archived)

1967 births
1998 suicides
Manga artists
Artists who committed suicide
Suicides by hanging in Japan
1998 deaths
Pseudonymous artists
People from Kawaguchi, Saitama